Jewel Beck Lansing (born c. 1930) is a writer and politician from Portland in the U.S. state of Oregon.

Lansing grew up in rural Montana.  She received a bachelor's degree in journalism from the University of Montana and a master's degree in education from Stanford University.  She moved to Portland in 1961.

She pioneered performance auditing in Portland and Multnomah County. She served as Multnomah County auditor from 1975 to 1982, and Portland auditor from 1983 to 1986. She was one of the first two women elected to Multnomah County government, and was the fifth elected to Portland government.

Lansing was also the Democratic nominee for Treasurer of Oregon in 1976 and 1980, narrowly losing to Republican Clay Myers in both general elections.

Books authored 
Lansing has published several books.
 Portland: People, Politics, and Power, 1851-2001. Oregon State University Press, 2003.
 Campaigning for Office: A Woman Runs (out of print). R & E Publishers, 1991.
 101 Campaign Tips for Women Candidates and Their Staffs (out of print). R & E Publishers, 1991.
 Deadly Games in City Hall (fiction/murder mystery). Skylark Press, 1997.
 My Montana: A History and Memoir, 1930 to 1950. Inkwater Press, 2007.
 A Czech Family Heritage: Bohemia-U.S.A. - 1765-1996 (out of print)
 with Ole J. Lokberg: The Beck Family Book: Norway-U.S.A. - 1700-1989 (out of print)
 with Fred Leeson: Multnomah: The Tumultuous Story of Oregon's Most Populous County. Oregon State University Press, 2012.

Personal
Lansing is married and lives in southwest Portland with her husband, Ron.  The couple raised two daughters, and a son.

References

External links 
 Official web site
 1976 Marion County Voter's Pamphlet. General Election, November 2, 1976

Government of Portland, Oregon
Oregon Democrats
University of Montana alumni
Stanford University alumni
American women writers
Women in Oregon politics
Writers from Portland, Oregon
21st-century American women

Living people

1930 births
Year of birth uncertain